Chase Contemporary is an American contemporary art gallery founded by Bernie Chase. It has locations in New York city and East Hampton.

History 
The gallery was founded in 2017 by Bernard (Bernie) Chase, the co-founder of Symbolic Motors. The premier exhibition of the show was held on June 16, 2017, and featured the works of the artist and photographer Raphael Mazzucco. In 2020, another location of the gallery was opened at East Hampton, New York.The gallery is known to participate in art festivals like Art Miami, Art New York etc.

In popular culture 
The gallery was one of the locations used in the documentary film The Underground Sistine Chapel.

Notable exhibitions 

 The Never Ending Summer, Raphael Mazzucco, 2018.
 Retrospective, Liu Shuishi, 2018.
 Untold Stories, Ole Aakjær, 2019.
 The Pink Soul, Ole Aakjær, 2019.
 Poverty/Porn, Steve Hash & Andy Warhol, 2019.
 We Were Here: East Coast x West Coast, Group Exhibition, 2019
 Richard Hambleton, Shadowman, 2019.
 50 Years, Carole A. Feuerman, 2020.
 Heroes, Kinki Texas, 2020.
 Between Colors and a Hard Place, Liu Shuishi, 2020.
 Cosmic Myth, Sheila Isham, 2021.
 Hallelujah Paintings, RETNA, 2021.
 Behind the Veil: Musings of Muraqaba, Imani Bilal, 2021.
 Alter Ego, Ole Aakjær, 2021.

References 

Art galleries established in 2017
Contemporary art galleries in the United States
Art museums and galleries in Manhattan